KMUW (89.1 FM), is a National Public Radio member station in Wichita, Kansas, United States, owned by Wichita State University.

History
KMUW first took to the air on April 26, 1949, as a 10-watt station owned by "Municipal University of Wichita" (former name of Wichita State University).  The station call letter name was derived from the first letters of the university name.  It was the first noncommercial FM station in Kansas, second FM station in Kansas, and the first 10-watt noncommercial FM station in the United States.

It was a charter member of NPR in 1971. In 1994, the station became an affiliate of Public Radio International. It also broadcasts the BBC World News from American Public Media.

Transmitting power
In 1949, KMUW started at 10 watts.  In 1962, it increased to 250 watts.  In 1970 to 10,000 watts.  In 1987 to 100,000 watts.

Location
On March 27, 1981, KMUW dedicated Blake Hall at 3317 East 17th Street in Wichita.

On April 25, 2016, KMUW moved to 121 North Mead Suite 200 in "old town" area of downtown Wichita.

See also
 Global Village

References

External links
 

Station information

Historical "After Midnight" / "Midnight Hour" (during 1980s, alternative college music show that was broadcast from 12am to 5am every night)
 KMUW After Midnight (R.I.P.) - Facebook
 Video of KMUW "After Midnight" Deejays - YouTube
 Audio of KMUW "Best of Midnight Hour" - archive.org

NPR member stations
Wichita State University
MUW